Hossein Papi (born February 27, 1985) is a retired Iranian football player who played for Sepahan in the Iran Pro League.

Club career
As product of Sepahan youth teams, Papi's talent was first discovered by Farhad Kazemi in 2004, and Luka Bonačić made him a starter in 2007, calling him "a prospect", but Papi's poor performance was hardly criticized by Bonačić in 2011. He is the captain of Sepahan F.C.

Club career statistics

 Assist Goals

International career 
Papi was invited to Iran national under-20 football team in December 2004.

Honours

Club
Sepahan
Iran Pro League (4): 2009–10, 2010–11, 2011–12, 2014–15
Iran Pro League Runner up: 2007–08
Hazfi Cup (2): 2006–07, 2012–13
AFC Champions League Runner-up: 2007

References

1985 births
Living people
Iranian footballers
Association football midfielders
Persian Gulf Pro League players
Sepahan S.C. footballers
Sepahan Novin players
People from Lorestan Province